USS McKee (AS-41), named after Andrew McKee, was the third  built by the Lockheed Shipbuilding and Construction Company of Seattle, Washington for the United States Navy.

The USS McKee was a mobile support and repair facility with the capability of providing simultaneous repairs to 12 nuclear-powered & diesel, fast-attack submarines. A versatile and complex ship, she provided everything a submarine might need: full medical and dental facilities; cranes, elevators and conveyors to move material on and off the ship as well as between decks; large storage areas for refrigerated and dry food; nuclear system repair and testing; electrical and electronics repair; hull repair; sheet metal and steel work; pipe fabrication; foundry work; woodworking; printing; underwater diving and rescue; hazardous material management; and propulsion and weapons systems repair.

USS McKee was one of the first warships in the U.S. Navy to integrate female sailors.

History

1981–1989
The ship was commissioned on 16 August 1981. Upon the commissioning of Submarine Squadron 11 (COMSUBRON11) in July 1986, she became the squadron's Command Ship.

Early in 1984, McKee became the first submarine tender certified to support the new Tomahawk cruise missile system. McKee earned three consecutive Battle Efficiency "E" awards in 1985, 1986 and 1987. In addition to the Battle "E" in 1986, McKee was honored with the Golden Anchor Award for retention excellence and her first Meritorious Unit Commendation.

In 1989, the McKee was the first submarine tender to visit Cold Bay, Alaska since World War II, and conducted the first nuclear submarine upkeep at this remote location. 1988 saw McKee become the first submarine tender certified to handle the Tomahawk Vertical Launch System (VLS).

1990–1999
In March 1990, the McKee continued leading the way for submarine tenders by participating in the first underway fuel replenishment (UNREP) by a Pacific Fleet submarine tender. This fuel was in preparation for deployment to the Persian Gulf in January 1991.

When Operation Desert Storm began, the McKee deployed to the Persian Gulf and spent six months providing support to submarines and surface combatants in Jebel Ali, just outside Dubai, United Arab Emirates. McKee was awarded a second Meritorious Unit Commendation and the Southwest Asia Service Medal. Following Desert Storm, McKee was awarded a fourth Battle Efficiency "E" Award.

In 1995, after the decommissioning of USS Dixon, McKee provided all support to San Diego based submarines. Assistance was also provided to many Allied submarines while they visited Point Loma.

In 1998, McKee earned a third Meritorious Unit Commendation following a six-month deployment to Pearl Harbor. During this deployment, McKee provided services and conducted repairs to both U.S. and Allied submarines and surface combatants. Upon returning to San Diego, the ship took the lead in establishing shore-based services that will support the submarines after McKee's departure.

In November 1998, the weapons department of the USS McKee loaded Tomahawk cruise missiles onto . These were the first of 67 Tomahawk cruise missiles sold to the Royal Navy and the first British submarine to receive the Tomahawk missiles. They were later used by HMS Splendid in offensive operations against Serbian targets during the Kosovo War.

On 1 October 1999, McKee was decommissioned from service and moved to the Naval Inactive Ship Maintenance Facility (NISMF), located in Portsmouth, Virginia.  She was struck from the Naval Register on 25 April 2006.

In popular culture
McKee is a submarine support vessel in the book SSN by Tom Clancy, playing an active role in battling the People's Liberation Army Navy in a fictional war over the Spratly Islands.   is the namesake submarine.

References

External links
 navsource.org: USS McKee
 http://www.tendertale.com/tenders/141/141.html

 

Emory S. Land-class submarine tenders
Submarine tenders
Submarine tenders of the United States Navy
United States Navy
Ships built by Lockheed Shipbuilding and Construction Company
1980 ships